143 is an extended play/mixtape by American recording artist Tiffany Evans. The EP was released on February 12, 2013, under Tiffany's recording label Little Lady Entertainment. It produced two singles: "U Got a Woman" and "If You Love Me", both released in 2012.

Singles
 EP's lead single was "U Got a Woman". First released as a buzz single on 10 January 2012 via Lucky Lady Entertainment, it appeared as a bonus track on EP.
 On June 8, 2012, Evans announced in an interview with Essence.com, that she had been married for one year and nine months and was expecting a child with her husband, Lorenzo Henderson. Evans and her husband welcomed their baby girl, Adalia Henderson, on September 25, 2012. Along with the news of her marriage and pregnancy, Evans also released her second single off the EP titled "If You Love Me", a powerful R&B ballad.

Track listing

References

Contemporary R&B EPs
Tiffany Evans albums
2013 EPs